The Wessex Electricity Company was an electricity generating and supply organisation that operated in south and south-west England from its establishment in 1927 until it was dissolved as a consequence of the nationalisation of the British electricity supply industry in 1948.

History 
The Wessex Electricity Company was formed as a subsidiary of the Edmundsons Electricity Corporation Limited on 29 July 1927. Its aim was to develop an integrated power supply system over a large area of southern England. The legal powers of the company were initially derived from the Wessex Electricity Act 1927 (17 & 18 Geo. 5 c. lxxii). Further powers were obtained by three further Local Acts of Parliament: the Wessex Electricity Act 1928 (18 & 19 Geo. 5 c. xc), the Wessex Electricity Act 1937 (1 Edw. 8 & 1 Geo. 6 c. lxviii), and the Wessex Electricity  Act 1940 (3 & 4 Geo. 6 c. xii).

Constituent Electricity undertakings 
The Wessex company assumed ownership of several small municipal and company electricity undertakings. It aimed to modernise, rationalise and integrate the distribution networks of these constituent companies. The company owned, at various times, the following electricity undertakings; the undertaking supply area is given where this is not apparent from the title: 

 Abingdon Electric Supply Company Limited
Chipping Norton Electric Supply Company Limited
Cirencester Electric Supply Company Limited
Cookham and District Electricity Corporation Limited 
 Crompton and Company Limited, Andover undertaking
 Downton near Salisbury, generating station
 Edmundsons Electricity Corporation Limited, Frome undertaking
 Lymington Electric Light and Power Company Limited
 Oxford Electric Company Limited
 Petters Limited, Yeovil undertaking
Thames Valley Electric Supply Company Limited
Tisbury Electric Supply Company Limited
 Urban Electric Supply Company Limited, Newbury undertaking
Wantage Electric Supply Company Limited
West Wiltshire Electric Light and Power Company Limited

Oxford Council exercised its rights in 1931 to purchase the Oxford undertaking and was able to reduce tariffs. However, this created an independent electricity ‘island’ within the Wessex supply area. In 1938 the shareholders of the Oxford Electricity Company recommended the sale of the company to the Wessex Electricity Company.

Supply area 
By 1937 the company was distributing electricity over a mainly rural area of 3,826 square miles (9,909 km2) encompassing a population of 750,000. It served most of Wiltshire, Oxfordshire and Berkshire, and parts of Buckinghamshire, Gloucestershire, Hampshire, Somerset and Dorset. The area included several growing centres of population around Andover, Newbury and Oxford. The Company had four Distribution Areas: North Oxfordshire; Mid Wessex; South Wessex No. 1; and South Wessex No. 2.  The Wessex system also connected to other power company systems such as the Shropshire, Worcestershire and Staffordshire Electric  Power Company.

Expansion and investment 
The expansion of the Wessex company’s business is shown in the increase in the connected electricity load in the late 1930s:

The company profits were £253,222 (1936), £251,881 (1937) and £259,769 (1938). In June 1939 the Wessex company raised capital for future developments by the sale of £1.5 million of debenture stock.

Following the Second World War the Wessex company proposed the expenditure of £3 million to bring electricity to a further 840 villages and hamlets in its supply area.

Electricity generation 
The electricity generating capacity and output of the constituent power stations in 1946 was:

Company directors 
The directors of the company in 1939 were:

 Lord Meston (James Scorgie Meston, 1865 – 1943) (Chairman)
 Wade H. Hayes (Deputy Chairman)
 G. W. Spenser Hawes
 F. H. James
 Sir Thomas Royden (later Lord Royden)
 A. Winterbotttom

The registered office was at Thames House, Millbank, London

Nationalisation 
The Wessex Electricity Company was abolished on 31 March 1948 under the terms of the Electricity Act 1947 which nationalised the British electricity supply industry. The company’s power stations and electricity transmission systems were vested in the British Electricity Authority. The local distribution systems and the electricity sales functions were vested in the Southern Electricity Board (SEB). The distribution districts were reformed as Board sub-areas and districts including Oxford, Portsmouth, Salisbury and Swindon Districts.

See also 

 List of pre-nationalisation UK electric power companies
 Timeline of the UK electricity supply industry
 List of power stations in England

References 

Defunct electric power companies of the United Kingdom
Electric power companies of England
Electric power infrastructure in England
Energy companies disestablished in 1948
British companies disestablished in 1948